William Sadlier may refer to:
 William Sadlier (bishop), Anglican bishop of Nelson
 William H. Sadlier, American family-owned publishing company
 Bill Sadlier, Australian rugby league player

See also
 William Sadler (disambiguation)